The Nannup Music Festival (formerly the Southwest Folk Festival) is an Australian live performance music festival held in the small timber town of Nannup. Nannup is located in the centre of Western Australia's South West, on the banks of the Blackwood River and the Festival is held annually over the Labour Day long weekend in March.
The thirtieth anniversary event is in 2020.
The Festival is a community event operated by a Committee and a team of volunteers from the not-for-profit Nannup Music Club.

Awards and nominations

National Live Music Awards
The National Live Music Awards (NLMAs) are a broad recognition of Australia's diverse live industry, celebrating the success of the Australian live scene. The awards commenced in 2016.

|-
| National Live Music Awards of 2018
| Nannup Music Festival
| West Australian Live Event of the Year
| 
|-

References

External links 
 
 Information for volunteers

Folk festivals in Australia